Alexander Ilyich Bukirev (September 12, 1903 Verkhmochki village, Perm Governorate, Kungursky Uyezd, Russian Empire –  August 26, 1964 Perm, Soviet Union) was a Soviet ichthyologist, professor, rector (from 1939 to 1941 and from 1946 to 1951), the Dean of the Faculty of Biology (from 1955 to 1956) of Perm State University. He founded a scientific direction in ichthyology that studied fish resources, fish variability, and patterns of formation of the fish fauna of the Kama reservoir.

Known for debunking the myth of the invincibility of the German tank "Tiger II".

Biography 
He was born in a peasant family. In 1922, he entered the Workers’ Faculty of Perm University and graduated in 1925. Then he was drafted in the Red Army. In 1927, he entered Perm University, but in 1929, the Perm City Committee decided to send him to work as the executive secretary of the Perm City Council. He graduated from the Biology Department of Perm Pedagogical Institute in 1931. He worked as a researcher and scientific secretary at the Biological Research Institute of Perm University and as an assistant at the Department of Vertebrate Zoology.

He and his colleagues organized and successfully carried out two ichthyological expeditions along the Upper and Middle Kama, the results of which were published in their widely known monograph "Fish and Fishing of the upper riverheads of the Kama River" (1934).

In 1939, he participated in battles of Khalkhin Gol and was seriously wounded. In June 1940, he was appointed rector of Perm University, from this post he joined the army as a volunteer. In 1941–1945, he participated in the Great Patriotic War and was the Head of an artillery battalion. He developed the methodology of fight against the Royal Tiger tank. The results of his study were in the brochure "The German Tiger heavy Tank and the fight against it", which was promptly published.

From 1946 to 1951, he was a rector of Molotov University. To overcome the post-war personnel crisis he attracted highly qualified specialists to the university. In 1951, he became an associate professor of the Department of Vertebrate Zoology at Molotov (Perm) University. From 1955 to 1956, he worked as Dean of the Faculty of Biology of Molotov University. In 1962, he was awarded the academic title of Professor.

He was one of the founders of the direction in ichthyology in Perm University that focused on the study of fish resources and fish variability. He discovered previously unknown brook trout in the Middle Kama. Moreover, he published 20 scientific papers, including two major summaries. Bukirev systematized the fish of the river Upper Kama, some other lakes and the river Irtysh. He had published dozens of newspaper and popular articles on biological issues. Over 25 years of teaching, he supervised about 300 specialists. Over 60 of them had become Candidates, and seven had become Doctors of Sciences.

Public Activity 
	a Deputy of the Perm Oblast, City and District Councils.
	a Chairman of the Soviet Peace Committee.
	one of the Founding members of the educational and propaganda organization “Znanie” in Soviet Union.

Memory 
The street in Perm is named after Alexander Bukirev.

Awards 
 Order of Lenin.
 Order of the Red Banner.
 Order of Kutuzov.
 Order of the Patriotic War.
 Order of the Red Star.
 Medal "For the Victory over Germany in the Great Patriotic War 1941–1945".
 Medal "For the Capture of Berlin".
 Medal "For the Liberation of Prague".

References

External links 
 111 years since the birth of Alexander Ilyich Bukirev // Perm University.
 Alenchikova N. About A.I. Bukirev (graduate of 1924) // Perm working faculty. Perm, 1975. Pp. 245–248.
 Alenchikova N. Rector of PSU A.I. Bukirev - man, scientist, warrior // Perm City Archive.
 Ivanov V. Scientist and Warrior // До последнего дыхания. Perm, 1966. Pp. 22–29.
 Kostitsyn V. Alexander Bukirev // Kostitsyn V. I. Rectors of Perm University. 1916–2006. Perm, 2006. 352 p. Pp. 91–103.
 Matlin A. The manual of Permian helped to destroy the German "Royal Tigers" // Komsomolskaya Pravda. 2015.12.25.
 Solovyov N. S. Scientist and warrior // Calendar-reference book of the Perm region. Perm, 1968, No. 10.
 Solovyov N. S., Barsukov V. V. In memory of Alexander Ilyich Bukirev (1903–1964) // Issues of ichthyology. М.: Nauka, 1965. V.5, Issue I (34). Pp. 198–202.
 Stabrovsky A. Scientist, warrior, teacher // Evening Perm. 1981. No. 233.
 

1903 births

1964 deaths
Russian ichthyologists
Perm State University alumni
Academic staff of Perm State University
Rectors of Perm State University